Group 3 of the 1954 FIFA World Cup took place from 16 to 19 June 1954. The group consisted of Austria, Czechoslovakia, Scotland, and Uruguay.

Standings

Matches
All times listed are local time (CET, UTC+1).

Uruguay vs Czechoslovakia

Austria vs Scotland

Uruguay vs Scotland

Austria vs Czechoslovakia

References

External links
 1954 FIFA World Cup archive

1954 FIFA World Cup
Scotland at the 1954 FIFA World Cup
Austria at the 1954 FIFA World Cup
Uruguay at the 1954 FIFA World Cup
Czechoslovakia at the 1954 FIFA World Cup